Convoy ON 127 was a trade convoy of merchant ships during the second World War. It was the 127th of the numbered series of ON convoys Outbound from the British Isles to North America and the only North Atlantic trade convoy of 1942 or 1943 where all U-boats deployed against the convoy launched torpedoes. St. Croixs commanding officer, acting Lieutenant Commander A. H. "Dobby" Dobson RCNR, was the senior officer of the escort group. The Canadian ships carried type 286 meter-wavelength radar but none of their sets were operational. Celandine carried Type 271 centimeter-wavelength radar. None of the ships carried HF/DF high-frequency direction finding sets.

Background
As western Atlantic coastal convoys brought an end to the second happy time, Admiral Karl Dönitz, the Befehlshaber der U-Boote (BdU) or commander in chief of U-Boats, shifted focus to the mid-Atlantic to avoid aircraft patrols. Although convoy routing was less predictable in the mid-ocean, Dönitz anticipated that the increased numbers of U-boats being produced would be able to effectively search the area with the advantage of intelligence gained through B-Dienst decryption of British Naval Cypher Number 3. However, only 20 percent of the 180 trans-Atlantic convoys sailing from the end of July 1942 until the end of April 1943 lost ships to U-boat attack.

Initial contact
Wolf pack Vorwarts was forming about 500 miles west of Ireland as the convoy left Liverpool. U-584 reported the convoy on 9 September, but lost contact that evening.

10 September
U-96 regained contact on 10 September and torpedoed the Norwegian tanker Svene, the tanker F.J.Wolfe and the Belgian freighter Elisabeth van Belgie in a single submerged daylight attack. Sherbrooke fell back to aid the torpedoed ships while St. Croix, Ottawa, and Celandine searched unsuccessfully for U-96. F.J.Wolfe was able to regain its station with the convoy.  Ottawa continued to patrol astern of the convoy after St. Croix and Celandine resumed their normal patrol stations.

A coordinated night attack on the convoy began with U-659 torpedoing the British tanker Empire Oil on the evening of 10 September. St. Croix made SONAR contact immediately prior to the attack and  Celandine, Ottawa, and St. Croix searched for U-659 after the attack. St. Croix and Ottawa fell back to rescue 23 of the stricken tanker's crew of 41. U-404 torpedoed the tanker Marit II, U-608 launched torpedoes which missed the convoy, U-218 torpedoed the tanker Fjordaas, and U-92 and U-594 launched torpedoes which missed the convoy before Ottawa, St. Croix, and Celandine rejoined the convoy. Sherbrooke remained astern of the convoy aiding the ships torpedoed by U-96, and rescued all but one of the crew of the sinking Svene and Elisabeth van Belgie. The remaining escorts counter-attacked, and depth charge damage forced U-659 and U-218 to return to port. Both Marit II and Fjordaas were able to regain their stations in the convoy. Empire Oil was later sunk astern of the convoy by U-584.

11 September
None of the escorts' RADAR sets were functional on 11 September. U-584 torpedoed the Norwegian Hindanger in a submerged daylight attack while St. Croix investigated a visual sighting six miles distant. Amherst fell back and rescued all but one of Hindangers crew.  A B-24 Liberator patrol bomber of No. 120 Squadron RAF prevented further daylight attacks on 11 September but U-96 sank a 415-ton Portuguese sailing trawler by gunfire in the vicinity of the convoy. In coordinated night attacks, U-380 missed with a salvo of four torpedoes, U-211 torpedoed the British whale factory ship Hektoria and freighter Empire Moonbeam, U-92 missed Ottawa with four torpedoes and U-404 torpedoed the tanker Daghild before Amherst and Sherbrooke rejoined the convoy. Daghild maintained station in the convoy and Arvida rescued all but four of the 140 crewmen from Hektoria and Empire Moonbeam before those ships were sunk astern of the convoy by U-608.

Parting shots
Excellent visibility on 12 September allowed a close forward screen of four escorts to discourage U-boats sighted up to 7 miles away. U-407 and U-594 launched torpedoes unsuccessfully that night. U-594 sank the straggling Stone Street as the convoy came within range of Canadian Canso patrol bombers from Botland, Newfoundland on 13 September. Both U-91 and U-411 launched torpedoes unsuccessfully while U-91 torpedoed the Canadian River-class destroyer  in the pre-dawn hours of 14 September. Ottawa sank with 114 of its crew. The remainder of the convoy reached New York City on 20 September 1942.

Ships in convoy

See also
 Convoy Battles of World War II

Notes

References
 
 
 
 
 
 

ON127
Naval battles of World War II involving Canada
C